Kosswigianella lutulenta is a species of delphacid planthoppers in the family Delphacidae. It is found in the Caribbean and North America.

References

 Hamilton, K. G. A., and Yong Jung Kwon / McAlpine, D. F., and I. M. Smith, eds. (2010). Taxonomic supplement to "short-horned" bugs (Homoptera) of the Atlantic Maritime Ecozone. Assessment of Species Diversity in the Atlantic Maritime Ecozone, 421–431.

Further reading

 Arnett, Ross H. (2000). American Insects: A Handbook of the Insects of America North of Mexico. CRC Press.

Delphacini